Steve Riley may refer to:
 Steve Riley (drummer) (born 1956), American heavy metal drummer for W.A.S.P. and L.A. Guns
 Steve Riley (American football) (1952–2021), American football player
 Steve Riley (politician) (born 1958), American politician
 Steve Riley, accordionist, singer, and leader of the Cajun band Steve Riley and the Mamou Playboys
 Steve Riley, character in the comic strip Foxtrot

See also
Steven Riley, professor of infectious disease dynamics